Monash University Malaysia, the Malaysian campus of Monash University opened in 1998 and is located in Bandar Sunway, Subang Jaya, Selangor, Malaysia. It is the first foreign university in Malaysia. Monash University Malaysia is one of several Monash University campuses and centres outside the State of Victoria in Australia. Monash University also has a centre in Prato, Italy, a campus in South Africa and a research academy in India.

Established in 1998, Monash Malaysia is the third largest campus worldwide of Australia's largest university and the first foreign university campus in Malaysia that operates in partnership with the Sunway Education Group.

A self-accrediting university, Monash University Malaysia is currently home to approximately 8,000 undergraduate and postgraduate students. The current head of the campus is President  & Pro Vice-Chancellor Professor Andrew Walker.

As one of the eight Monash University campuses, the Malaysian campus is subject to Monash University for all matters related to academic development, teaching and support.

History

Conception and development
In the early 1990s, Monash University established a partnership with Sunway University. Under this arrangement, Malaysian students would enrol and spend their first year in Malaysia, before transferring to one of Monash's Australian campuses to complete their degree. Demand increased for these places rapidly and the potential to expand the program was clear. Monash itself had ambitions to develop a comprehensive international campus from the beginning of Mal Logan's term as Vice-Chancellor. However, this proposal was complicated for the Malaysian Government, which was hesitant to allow a foreign university to establish itself in Malaysia. Nonetheless, as the strength of Monash in Malaysia grew, the case for a Monash campus became increasingly persuasive.

Foundation
In early 1996, it was reported that the Australian Prime Minister had been involved in the signing of a memorandum of understanding to establish the campus. On 23 February 1998, the Malaysian Government formally invited Monash to develop a comprehensive campus, making it the first foreign university in Malaysia. In July of that year, Monash University's newly founded Malaysia campus opened its doors to its first intake of 261 students. Since then, the campus has expanded rapidly. It developed postgraduate courses within a few years, and began to expand its research capacity.

2000s onwards
By 2007, it had 3,300 students, and had established a new, purpose-built, fully independent campus. The university has stated that it intends the campus to eventually hold around 10,000 students and that it will develop its research strengths to make it a research hub of South-East Asia.

Academics

Research
Research activity is central to Monash University Malaysia. The campus has research strengths in biotechnology, medicine & health, economic & business modelling, Islamic banking, electronic test technology and agri-business.

Monash University Malaysia is also home to the Brain Research Institute at Monash Sunway, led by neuroscientist Professor Ishwar Parhar. Areas of research at BRIMS include Neuroinformatics; Nanotechnology for regenerative medicine/drug delivery; Brain imaging; Behavioural neurogenetics/Mental Disorders; Genomics/Proteomics and Molecular Morphology. In recent years, the BRI have developed a technique that allows for neurons of interest to be isolated with precision without damaging surrounding neurons.

Genomics Cluster: The Genomics Cluster (also referred to as the Monash University Malaysia Genomics Facility) within the Tropical Medicine and Biology Multidisciplinary Platform provides Next Generation DNA Sequencing services to support the research of Monash University staff and students from both Malaysia and Australia. The Cluster also supports a number of Malaysian-based and international collaborations and is beginning to undertake contract sequencing for external clients. Annual funding to support the Cluster is provided by Monash University Malaysia, which is supplemented through income from external grants and contract sequencing.

In October 2007, an Innovation Research Centre was also set up at Monash University Malaysia. The research centre is an open organisation that will analyse input from the business sector and academia to provide feedback on how innovation and related policies can contribute to the Malaysian economy.

In February 2009, two Monash Islamic Finance scholars have developed the first ever Encyclopaedia of Islamic Finance, providing industry professionals a comprehensive resource on the fastest growing banking sector around the world.

Under a new partnership the university's Brain Research Institute at Monash Sunway (BRIMS) and MIMOS in April 2009, which would use the KnowledgeGRID Malaysia grid computational platform to identify neurons and other parts of the brain to produce one of the world's first digital molecular atlas of the fish brain.

On 20 November 2011, The South East Asia Community Observatory (SEACO), a research platform for studying life course health and well being in a community setting, was officiated by the Chief Minister of Johor, Y.A.B. Dato' Haji Abdul Ghani bin Othman in Johor Bahru. SEACO is a health and demographic surveillance system (HDSS) located in the district of Segamat, Johor with an enumerated population of around 38,000 people. The research platform was established by an international partnership of universities, managed by Monash University Malaysia, and hosted by the Jeffrey Cheah School of Medicine and Health Sciences.

As at February 2018, Monash University Malaysia has established several multidisciplinary research platforms that enable scientists in the region to work on global challenges in the following key areas: Tropical Medicine and Biology; Advanced Engineering; Global Asia in the 21st Century (GA21); Monash-Industry Palm Oil Education and Research; Brain Research Institute Monash Sunway (BRIMS); and a multidisciplinary health and demographic surveillance site, the South East Asian Community Observatory (SEACO).

Schools and Faculties
Monash University's Malaysia campus offers courses from undergraduate through to PhD through the following schools:
 School of Arts & Social Sciences
 School of Business 
 School of Engineering
 School of Information Technology
 School of Pharmacy
 School of Science
 Jeffrey Cheah School of Medicine and Health Sciences
All Schools offer honours programmes, Master's, MPhil and PhD courses.

Accreditation
Most courses offered by Monash University Malaysia are accredited in Malaysia and Australia. Recently, the university also received accreditation from the Australian Medical Council (AMC) for its MBBS programme. It is the first programme fully taught outside Australia and New Zealand to be accredited by the AMC. The university has also just recently received full accreditation from the Malaysian Medical Council (MMC) in 2010. The university successfully underwent an audit by the Australian Universities Quality Agency (AUQA), reaffirming the university's high level of quality education provided to students in Malaysia.

The School of Business in Monash University Malaysia in Malaysia is accredited by the Association to Advance Collegiate Schools of Business (AACSB) and is also an Advanced Signatory Member of Principles for Responsible Management Education (PRME) initiative which is the largest organized relationship between the United Nations and business schools.

The School of Pharmacy of Monash University Malaysia received full accreditation for its four-year Bachelor of Pharmacy program, from Lembaga Farmasi Malaysia (the Pharmacy Board of Malaysia).

Conferences
Monash University Malaysia has been the host of many regional and international conferences.

In October 2008, the campus hosted the 6th International Islamic Finance Conference. The conference has been jointly organised by Monash University and the Institut Bank-Bank Malaysia; Islamic Banking and Finance Institute Malaysia.

In September 2008, the Malaysia campus has hosted the 5th Diversity Matters forum, which is organised by the Australian Multicultural Foundation, in partnership with the Monash Institute for the Study of Global Movements, the Commonwealth Foundation, Monash University, The Statesman of India and the Asian Strategy and Leadership Institute. The conference focuses on the role of diasporas in helping achieve the Commonwealth's vision and mandates, and the part diasporas can play in shaping and implementing Commonwealth programs.

The campus also hosted The East Asian Medical Students' Conference (EAMSC) in December 2008. The EAMSC is one of two conferences organised by AMSA annually.

In December 2015 the School of Arts and Social Sciences hosted a conference titled "Internet in Southeast Asia".

Location 
The campus is located in the township of Bandar Sunway in Subang Jaya in Selangor, Malaysia. It is around 30 minutes drive from Kuala Lumpur.

Student life

Student Governing Body
The Monash University Students Association (MUSA) is the campus' student association. Governed by the Monash Student Council (MSC), MUSA serves as the recognised means of communication between students and academic and administrative authorities of the university. It is known for its activism on issues relating to gender equality and students' rights, and for having organised events such as the Monash Street Party, Monash Flea Market, Monash Motor Show, Monash Extreme Sports Carnival and the Monash Ball, as well as orientation parties and activities.

The Monash University Postgraduate Association (MUPA) was founded in May 2007 with the aim of being the recognized means of communication between postgraduates/honours students and the academic and administrative authorities of the university. MUPA facilitates two-way communication between postgraduate/honours students and the academic and administrative authorities of the university.

See also
 List of universities in Malaysia

References

External links
 

1998 establishments in Malaysia
Campuses of Monash University
Australia–Malaysia relations
Engineering universities and colleges in Malaysia
Universities and colleges in Selangor
Educational institutions established in 1998
Private universities and colleges in Malaysia
Subang Jaya